was a  after Enryaku and before Kōnin. This period spanned the years from May 806 through September 810.

Change of era
 November 16, 806 : The new era name was created to mark an event or series of events. The previous era ended and the new one commenced in Enryaku 25, on the 18th day of the 5th month of 806.

Events of the Daidō era
 April 9, 806 (Daidō 1, 17th day of the 3rd month): In the 25th year of Emperor Kammu's reign (桓武天皇25年), he died, and despite an ensuing dispute over who should follow him as sovereign, contemporary scholars then construed that the succession (senso) was received by his son. Shortly thereafter, Emperor Heizei is said to have acceded to the throne (sokui).
 May 18, 809 (Daidō 4, 1st day of the 4th month): In the 4th year of Emperor Heizei's reign (平城天皇4年), he fell ill and abdicated, and the succession (senso) was received by his second son, the eldest son having become a Buddhist priest. Shortly thereafter, Emperor Saga is said to have acceded to the throne (sokui).

Notes

References
 Brown, Delmer M. and Ichirō Ishida, eds. (1979).  Gukanshō: The Future and the Past. Berkeley: University of California Press. ;  OCLC 251325323
 Nussbaum, Louis-Frédéric and Käthe Roth. (2005).  Japan encyclopedia. Cambridge: Harvard University Press. ;  OCLC 58053128
 Titsingh, Isaac. (1834). Nihon Odai Ichiran; ou,  Annales des empereurs du Japon.  Paris: Royal Asiatic Society, Oriental Translation Fund of Great Britain and Ireland. OCLC 5850691
 Varley, H. Paul. (1980). A Chronicle of Gods and Sovereigns: Jinnō Shōtōki of Kitabatake Chikafusa. New York: Columbia University Press. ;  OCLC 6042764

External links 
 National Diet Library, "The Japanese Calendar" -- historical overview plus illustrative images from library's collection

Japanese eras
9th century in Japan
806 beginnings
810 endings